Royal Air Force Woolsington, or more simply RAF Woolsington, was a civilian airfield that was taken over by the RAF in 1939. It was returned to civilian use in 1946 and is now Newcastle International Airport.

History
RAF Woolsington opened as a civil airport in July 1935 with a small scale military involvement from the start. An airfield close to Newcastle had first been proposed by the Air Ministry in 1929 and in 1933 suitable sites were being assessed for a runway with Town Moor also being considered. The whole of the site was requisitioned by the Royal Air Force in 1939 on the outbreak of World War II, however, 13 Group Communications Flight had been in existence at Woolsington for a month when war was declared. 43 Elementary and Reserve Flying Training School was formed in June 1939 and was disbanded just three months later in September 1939.

The base served at various times as a satellite of both RAF Acklington and RAF Ouston but saw little operational flying. However, on one notable occasion in 1940, a Spitfire of No. 72 Squadron RAF flying out of Woolsington actually shot down a Junkers Ju 88 at night. This was one of the few 'kills' at night attributed to Spitfires.

In 1941, Durham University Air Squadron (DUAS) was formed at Woolsington initially flying Tiger Moth aircraft. The unit stayed behind when all other squadrons and units were transferred out at the end of the Second World War, eventually moving on to RAF Usworth in 1949.

Woolsington's main wartime role was as the base of No. 83 Maintenance Unit which salvaged crashed aircraft over much of the region. After the war civil flying resumed and the airport is now known as Newcastle International Airport.

Units
The following units or squadrons were based at (or used) RAF Woolsington between 1936 and 1946.
No. 13 Group Communication Flight RAF
No. 27 Gliding School RAF
No. 43 Elementary and Reserve Flying Training School RAF
No. 55 Operational Training Unit
No. 62 Operational Training Unit
No. 72 Squadron RAF
No. 83 Maintenance Unit RAF
No. 278 Squadron RAF
No. 281 Squadron RAF
Durham University Air Squadron

See also
 RAF Blyton
 RAF Brize Norton
 RAF Coleby Grange
 RAF Coningsby
 RAF Cranwell
 RAF Northolt

References

Bibliography

External links
fotopic page
Report on 20th Century defence sites in Tyne and Wear

Royal Air Force stations in Northumberland
Royal Air Force stations of World War II in the United Kingdom